WWPR (1490 kHz) is an American AM radio station licensed to serve the community of Bradenton, the county seat of Manatee County, Florida, United States. The station is currently owned and operated by Vidify Media, Inc.

Programming
On weekdays, WWPR broadcasts a talk radio format to Manatee County, as well as parts of Sarasota, Pinellas, and Hillsborough counties. On weekday mornings and mid-days these are local political talk programs. Weekday programs also include talk shows on health, boating, and sports. Weekends include religious and Spanish-language programs.

History
The station, founded in 1946 as WDHL, was assigned the call sign WWPR by the Federal Communications Commission (FCC) on January 3, 1995.

References

External links
WWPR official website

WPR
WPR
Talk radio stations in the United States
Radio stations established in 1946
Manatee County, Florida
WPR
Mass media in the Tampa Bay area
1946 establishments in Florida